Kornhorn is a village in Westerkwartier municipality in the Dutch province of Groningen. It had a population of around 495 in 2021.

Overview 
Kornhorn is situated along a dike in a raised bog. It was first mentioned in 1596 as Corriger sandt. The current name means the people of Corre/Curre near the bend (of the dike). (See also: Koarnjum). In 1840, the hamlet was home to 61 people, and considered part of Doezum. In 1930, it received the status of a village. In the 1940s, a disagreement to which parish Kornhorn belonged, resulted in a schism and the establishment of three churches. In 2017, one of the churches dissolved. In 2018, it became part of the municipality Westerkwartier.

Notable people 
  (1895–1941), murderer about whom the film The Mark of the Beast was made

References

External links 

Westerkwartier
Westerkwartier (municipality)
Populated places in Groningen (province)